Chi-Congo is an album recorded in Paris in 1970 by the Art Ensemble of Chicago which was first released in 1972 on the French Decca label, later reissued in the US on the Paula label. It features performances by Lester Bowie, Joseph Jarman, Roscoe Mitchell, Malachi Favors Maghostut, and Don Moye.

Reception
The Allmusic review by Rob Ferrier awarded the album 4 stars noting that "these gentlemen are sterling musicians and everything is done for a purpose, exactly when they want it to happen. A wonderful record by a bunch of really great guys".

Track listing
 "Chi-Congo" (Favors) – 11:40
 "Enlorfe" (Mitchell) – 14:39
 "Hippparippp" (Mitchell) – 10:30

Personnel
Lester Bowie: trumpet, percussion instruments
Malachi Favors Maghostut: bass, percussion instruments, vocals
Joseph Jarman: saxophones, clarinets, percussion instruments
Roscoe Mitchell: saxophones, clarinets, flute, percussion instruments
Don Moye: drums, percussion

References

1970 albums
Art Ensemble of Chicago albums
Decca Records albums